EP C is the first EP from the American math rock band Battles. It was released on Monitor Records.

Track listing

Personnel
 Dave Konopka – bass guitar, guitar, effects
 John Stanier – drums
 Ian Williams – guitar, keyboards
 Tyondai Braxton – guitar, keyboards, vocals

Battles (band) EPs
2004 EPs